Operation Safed Sagar (lit. "Operation White Ocean") was the code name assigned to the Indian Air Force's role in acting jointly with the Indian Army during the 1999 Kargil war that was aimed at flushing out regular and irregular troops of the Pakistani Army from vacated Indian Positions in the Kargil sector along the Line of Control. It was the first large scale use of Airpower in the Jammu and Kashmir region since the Indo-Pakistani War of 1971.

Operations

Ground operations

Initial infiltrations were noticed in Kargil in early May, 1999. Because of the extreme winter weather in Kashmir, it was common practice for the Indian and Pakistan Army to abandon forward posts and reoccupy them in the spring. That particular spring, the Pakistan Army started reoccupying the forward posts well before the scheduled time. In a preliminary step in their bid to capture Kashmir, they reoccupied not only their own posts, but also 132 posts that belonged to India.

By the second week of May, an ambush on an Indian army patrol acting on a tip-off by a local shepherd in the Batalik sector led to the exposure of the infiltration. Initially with little knowledge of the nature or extent of the encroachment, the Indian troops in the area initially claimed that they would evict them within a few days. However, reports of infiltration elsewhere along the LoC soon made it clear that the entire plan of attack was on a much bigger scale. India responded with Operation Vijay, a mobilisation of 200,000 Indian troops. However, because of the nature of the terrain, division and corps operations could not be mounted; the scale of most fighting was at the regimental or battalion level. In effect, two divisions of the Indian Army, numbering 20,000, along with several thousand from the Paramilitary forces of India and the air force were deployed in the conflict zone.
the Indian Army moved into the region in full force. The intruders were found to be well entrenched and while artillery attacks had produced results in certain areas, more remote ones needed the help of the air force. To avoid the escalation, the Government of India (GoI) cleared only limited use of Air Power on May 25, more than three weeks after first reports, with the instructions that IAF fighter jets will remain within Indian territory to launch attack on intruder's position within Indian territory and IAF was not permitted to cross the Line of Control under any circumstance.

Air operations

Summary of air operations
Breakdown of Total Number of Sorties Flown by Aircraft Type:

Breakdown of Air Operations by Task (Fast Jets)

Details of air operations 

The Indian Air Force (IAF) had been carrying out routine Electronic intelligence (ELINT), photo and Aerial reconnaissance since early May in such weather. On May 21, a Canberra PR57 from 106 Squadron on a reconnaissance mission, flown by Wg Cdr CH Kulkarni, Sqn Ldr A Perumal and Sqn Ldr UK Jha, was hit by a Chinese-made Anza infrared surface-to-air missile. The plane returned to the nearest IAF base, Srinagar, on one engine, and the crew landed safely. The Indian Govt, intent on not provoking escalation, cleared limited use of offensive and defensive Air Power only on May 25, restricted entirely to the Indian side of the Line of Control. There was no opposition at all by the Pakistani Air Force, leaving the IAF free to carry out its attacks with impunity.

The Indian Air Force (IAF) flew its first air support missions on 26 May, operating from the Indian airfields of Srinagar, Awantipora and Adampur. Ground attack aircraft MiG-21s, MiG-23s, MiG-27s, Jaguars and helicopter gunships struck insurgent positions. The Mirage 2000 fleet was inducted on 30 May. Although the MiG-21 is built mainly for air interception with a secondary role of ground attack, it is capable of operating in restricted spaces, albeit with limited influence, which was of importance in the Kargil terrain.

The initial strikes had the Air Defence versions of the MiG-21s and (later) MiG-29s providing fighter cover. Mil Mi-17 gunships were also deployed in the Tololing sector. Srinagar Airport was at this time closed to civilian air-traffic and dedicated to the Indian Air Force.

The first fatality was suffered on May 27 when a MiG-27 crashed due to engine flame-out and a MiG-21 was shot down by the Pakistan Army, both over Batalik sector. The MiG-27, piloted by then Flt Lt K Nachiketa, suffered an engine flameout due to the ingestion of the exhaust gas of the weapons fired. Squadron Leader Ajay Ahuja, who was escorting Nachiketa in his MiG-21 tried to trace the downed MiG-27 despite the potent threat in the form of enemy Surface to Air Missiles and his plane was shot down by a Stinger shoulder fired missile. It is believed by the Indian military that he survived the crash but was killed by Pakistan Army soldiers or irregulars. The body of Ahuja bore two point-blank bullet wounds as per the postmortem done by the Indian authorities. The point-blank injuries clearly indicated the intent of the enemy and the treatment a violation of Geneva conventions. Flt Lt Nachiketa was later paraded on Pakistan TV; this prompted India to accuse Pakistan of violating the Geneva convention on the treatment of Prisoners of War.

The following day, a Mi-17 was shot down- with the loss of all four of the crew- when it was hit by three Stinger missiles while on an offensive sortie in the Tololing sector. These losses forced the Indian Air Force to reassess its strategy. The helicopters were immediately withdrawn from offensive roles as a measure against the Man-portable air-defense system (MANPADS or MPADS) in possession of the infiltrators.

Starting May 30, the LGB capable Mirage 2000, which was deemed the best aircraft in the IAF inventory capable of optimum performance under the conditions of high-altitude seen in the zone of conflict, was used extensively. Armed initially with 250 kg "dumb" bombs, No. 7 Squadron led by Wg Cdr Sandeep Chabra, struck over three days infiltrator positions in Muntho Dhalo, Tiger Hill and Point 4388 in the Drass Sector. The receding snowline in June laid bare the hitherto camouflaged Pakistani positions, opening them up to non-stop day and night attacks by the Mirage 2000 and, subsequently, all aircraft.

Through the last weeks of June, the Mirages, armed with LGBs as well as with "dumbs", repeatedly struck the heavily defended Tiger Hill. Only 9 LGBs were used in this war, 8 by the Mirage and one by a Jaguar, as the dumb bombs proved highly effective. The first of the LGB missions on June 24 were observed by the (then) Chief of Air Staff, ACM AY Tipnis. All LGBs were delivered by two-seaters, with the rear-seat pilot doubling up as a WSO.

The Mirage 2000 proved its worth in this war. Such was its accuracy with dumb bombs that an LGB-equipped two-seater would join up as the tail of a 2 or 4-ship formation of other Mirages carrying between 6-12 dumb bombs each, film their attacks, and only if the results were less than optimal, or if it had spotted a Command and Control bunker on its Litening sensor / camera, let loose its LGB. The IAF therefore used the LGB selectively.

All aircraft operated at an altitude of 9-10,000 metres, (~30-33,000 feet above sea level), diving when required and pulling out well out of MANPADs range. The low number of airstrips for take off and landing of the flights also constrained the regularity and efficiency of the attacks. Despite this, there were hundreds of sorties on the intruders with no further material or personnel casualties enabling a gradual takeover of the mountain posts by Indian troops. According to the IAF, the "air strikes against the Pakistani infiltrators, supply camps and other targets yielded rich dividends."

All remaining intruders were withdrawn and the operation was ended, being declared a success by the IAF in having achieved its primary objectives. However, there has also been criticism of the methods initially used and the type of planes being unsuitable to the terrain that resulted in early losses.  This is believed by many in the Air force as coming as a wake up call to upgrade the ageing fleet of aircraft (especially the attack aircraft and helicopters) to better enable them to fight in the mountainous region. But, in the context of the war and in light of the poor information available on the infiltrations, the Indian Air Force was able to coordinate well with the Army and provide air support to the recapture of most of the posts before Pakistan decided to withdraw its remaining troops.

Aftermath
The lessons learned in this limited war influenced Indian Air Force to upgrade its combat fleet. It acquired and later started co-developing Sukhoi Su-30MKI heavy fighters with Russia beginning in the early 2000s. Development of HAL Tejas was also accelerated.

See also

 AGPL (Actual Ground Position Line), south to north runs through the following
 NJ9842, LoC ends and AGPL begins
 Gyong La
 Chumik Glacier
 Saltoro Mountains
 Saltoro Kangri
 Ghent Kangri
 Bilafond La
 Sia La
 Indira Col, AGPL ends at LAC

 Borders
 Actual Ground Position Line (AGPL)
 India–Pakistan International Border (IB)
 Line of Control (LoC)
 Line of Actual Control (LAC)
 Sir Creek (SC)
 Borders of China
 Borders of India
 Borders of Pakistan

 Conflicts
 Kashmir conflict
 Siachen conflict
 Sino-Indian conflict
 List of disputed territories of China
 List of disputed territories of India
 List of disputed territories of Pakistan
 Northern Areas
 Trans-Karakoram Tract

 Operations
 Operation Meghdoot, by India
 Operation Rajiv, by India

 Other related topics
 Awards and decorations of the Indian Armed Forces
 Bana Singh, after whom Quaid Post was renamed to Bana Top 
 Dafdar, westernmost town in Trans-Karakoram Tract
 India-China Border Roads
 List of extreme points of India
 Sino-Pakistan Agreement for transfer of Trans-Karakoram Tract to China

References

External links

Safed Sagar
Kargil War
1999 in India
History of the Indian Air Force
Safed Sagar